Nik Johnson (born 1969) is a British Labour Co-op politician and paediatrician who has served as the mayor of Cambridgeshire and Peterborough since 2021.

Early life and medical career 
Nik Johnson was born in Northumberland in 1969. He grew up in Hexham, Northumberland and trained as a doctor at St George's Hospital Medical School, qualifying in 1993. He has worked as a paediatrician at Hinchingbrooke Hospital since 2007.

Johnson had an interest in politics from an early age, growing up in the 1980s he was aware of the societal changes in the UK (particularly in the industrial areas of North East England). Johnson started campaigning for Labour alongside his role as a junior doctor not long after qualifying.

Early political career

Labour candidate and councillor 
Johnson stood as the Labour Party candidate in the 2015 general election for the Huntingdon constituency. He came second with 18.3% of the vote. In 2017, he sought selection to be Labour's candidate in the inaugural Cambridgeshire and Peterborough mayoral election but was not shortlisted. Later in that year, Johnson stood again as the Labour candidate for Huntingdon in the 2017 general election. He came second again, increasing his share of the vote to 30.9% and cutting the majority by 10.5%.

He unsuccessfully stood for election to Huntingdonshire District Council and Cambridgeshire County Council on six occasions from 2012 to 2017, before being elected as a Huntingdonshire district councillor for St Neots East in 2018.

In June 2020, during the COVID-19 pandemic, Johnson signed an open letter organised by the Royal College of Paediatrics and Child Health that called on the government to release its plans for returning children to schools for the sake of their mental health.

2021 Cambridge and Peterborough mayoral election 
Johnson was selected to be the Labour candidate by a vote of local party members in November 2020, beating the Cambridge city councillor Katie Thornburrow. In his campaign, he said would introduce bus franchising, alongside rebranding buses and providing free or subsidised bus travel to young people. He also said he would seek government funding to build more council houses. He also proposed renaming the combined authority to "Greater Cambridgeshire". Despite having stood as "Dr Nik Johnson" in four previous elections to public office, he was prevented from using his title on the ballot paper for this election.

Johnson was elected to the role of Mayor of Cambridgeshire and Peterborough in the 2021 mayoral election. Upon taking office, he became entitled to the style of Mayor. In the first round, he came in second place with 32.8% of the vote. He won in the second round when he received 72.7% of transferred second preferences from the eliminated Liberal Democrat candidate. Residents of Johnson's village, Great Gransden, stood on the street and applauded his victory. He said he would continue to work half a day each week as a paediatrician.

Mayor of Cambridge and Peterborough

Transport 
In his first week in office, Johnson cancelled plans for an autonomous metro project that James Palmer, his Conservative predecessor, had supported. Johnson said the project had "all the hallmarks of being an expensive folly and a potential financial blackhole" and he would instead consider alternative ways to integrate and improve transport in the combined authority. The Conservative leader of East Cambridgeshire District Council, Anna Bailey, accused Johnson of acting without consulting the combined authority and leaving the area with "no plan". The Labour leader of Cambridge City Council defended Johnson as having "a more practical focus" and said that the autonomous metro plan had "no fundability". After suspending work on the proposed autonomous metro, Johnson commissioned a new transport plan focused on areas that have suffered from deprivation and equality, and on reducing carbon emissions. He blocked a proposal to spend £350,000 on consultants to study the aborted metro project, and started a review of the use of consultants with the intention of completing work internally as much as possible. He met with the mayor of Greater Manchester, Andy Burnham, in July to discuss options for transport.

He arranged for the combined authority to provide £350,000 to support investment in Peterborough railway station in August 2021. The UK's transport minister, Chris Heaton-Harris, initially withheld funding for active travel in the region, which Johnson secured by offering his commitments to active travel and beginning the process to appoint an independent cycling tsar.

Other projects 
In June, Johnson made sure that all combined authority staff were paid a living wage and started discussions with trade unions. In June, Johnson announced a plan to submit a bid for the combined authority to become the UK City of Culture focused on Peterborough, Cambridge and Ely. However, he did not make a bid, citing the impact of the COVID-19 pandemic on culture in the region and a lack of time to prepare a good enough bid.

In July, the combined authority agreed to provide £1,800,000 of new funding to train more than 800 people starting in March 2022. In August, he won the support of the combined authority to provide £1,100,000 to a development project in the town of March in order to prevent it losing a government grant of several more millions of pounds.

In August, Johnson called on businesses to encourage their staff to get vaccinated against COVID-19.

Electoral history

Council elections

UK Parliament elections

Mayoral elections

Personal life 
Johnson is married to Donna McShane and has three children.

References 

Mayors of Cambridgeshire and Peterborough
Living people
21st-century English politicians
Labour Party (UK) mayors
1969 births